Brdovec is a municipality in the Zagreb County, Croatia. The closest town to Brdovec is neighboring Zaprešić on the east.

Demographics

According to the 2001 census, there are 10,287 inhabitants, 92% which are Croats. They live in 13 settlements:

 Brdovec - 2,310
 Donji Laduč - 745
 Drenje Brdovečko - 694
 Gornji Laduč - 864
 Harmica - 232
 Javorje - 634
 Ključ Brdovečki - 663
 Prigorje Brdovečko - 1,258
 Prudnice - 641
 Savski Marof - 35
 Šenkovec - 733
 Vukovo Selo - 381
 Zdenci Brdovečki - 1,097

Austro-Hungarian 1910 census
According to the 1910 census in Croatia, municipality of Brdovec had 4,021 inhabitants, which were linguistically and religiously declared as:

References

External links 

 Official site

 
Municipalities of Croatia
Populated places in Zagreb County
Zaprešić